James Henry Knowles (1881–1923) was an English footballer who played in the Football League for Bolton Wanderers.

References

1881 births
1923 deaths
English footballers
Association football forwards
English Football League players
Bolton Wanderers F.C. players
Turton F.C. players